is a former Japanese football player.

Club statistics

References

External links

1991 births
Living people
Association football people from Shizuoka Prefecture
Japanese footballers
J1 League players
J2 League players
Japan Football League players
Shonan Bellmare players
FC Ryukyu players
Association football midfielders